BirdLife Cyprus (BLC) is an environmental non-governmental organisation dedicated to the conservation of birds and their habitats on the island of Cyprus in the eastern Mediterranean, for which it is the BirdLife International partner organisation. The emblem of BLC is the Cyprus wheatear, which is an endemic species (it breeds only on the island).

History
BirdLife Cyprus was formed in 2003 through the merger of two Cyprus Ornithological Societies, and now has offices in Strakka, Nicosia. It is the national partner of BirdLife International, a global partnership of nature conservation organisations working in more than one hundred countries worldwide.

BirdLife Cyprus is currently the most active conservation organisation in Cyprus, running campaigns against illegal bird trapping and poaching. Other activities include the designation and protection of Important Bird Areas as Special Protection Areas, as well as campaigns in the area of agriculture, education and awareness-raising.

Activities
Activities include an ongoing campaign against the illegal bird trapping of wild birds, the protection of Important Bird Areas, the establishment of Special Protection Areas under the European Union's Birds Directive, and the promotion of environmentally friendly agriculture.

BirdLife Cyprus campaigns at both local and European levels on behalf of birds and their habitats here Cyprus:

Monitoring and counts:
Effective conservation action is impossible without reliable bird population data. As well as producing monthly and annual reports for bird sightings, BirdLife Cyprus has set up and run systematic and scientific monitoring schemes such as monthly counts of wetland birds, a common bird census and surveys of migrating raptors.

Habitats:
BirdLife Cyprus campaigns to ensure official designation of the scientifically identified Important Bird Areas (IBAs) as Special Protection Areas (SPAs). SPAs form part of the pan-European Natura 2000 network of biodiversity hotspots. These SPAs should be managed to ensure proper conservation of the bird species they support and sustainable development of local communities.

Illegal bird trapping:
BirdLife Cyprus is working to bring an end to illegal bird trapping. Birds trapped on limesticks and in nets die a horrible death and are then sold to be eaten as ambelopoulia, a supposed delicacy. Many migratory and threatened species fall victim to the indiscriminate nets and glue sticks. A recent opinion poll showed that the majority of Cypriots are against this illegal activity.  It is estimated that over 2 million birds were killed in 2015 including over 800,000 on the British Territories.

Agriculture:
The predominantly low-intensity agriculture in Cyprus makes it an attractive place for birds. Agricultural intensification in Europe has had a well-documented and disastrous effect on farmland birds. BirdLife Cyprus promotes a set of practical proposals to ensure local farming practices are kept wildlife-friendly.

Education:
BirdLife Cyprus also works to raise awareness about the birds of Cyprus and issues that affect them and their habitats. This is done through a combination of articles in the local media and events/talks to introduce people to Cyprus’ birds.

Projects:
The organisation also implements, or takes part in other programmes, such as the LIfe Oroklini Project for the restoration and management of the Oroklini Lake, the Gypas Project for the recovery of the extremely reduced Cypriot population of griffon vultures, carried out under the Cross-border Cooperation Programme Greece-Cyprus (2007–2013) and the Darwin Plus project Akrotiri Marsh Restoration: a flagship wetland in the Cyprus SBAs for the restoration of Akrotiri Marsh to a mosaic of habitats, similar to the state it was in some decades ago

References

External links
BirdLife International
Hellenic Ornithological Society
BirdLife Malta
Game and Fund Service Cyprus
Mediteraves Project

Bird conservation organizations
BirdLife International
Nature conservation in Cyprus
Animal welfare organisations based in Cyprus
Environmental organizations established in 2003
Ornithological organizations
Environmental organisations based in Cyprus
2003 establishments in Cyprus